Numbal is a village and union council of Murree Tehsil in the Murree District of Punjab, Pakistan.

It is located in the south central area of the tehsil to the south of Murree. According to the 1998 census of Pakistan it had a population of 11,547.

References

Union councils of Murree Tehsil
Populated places in Murree Tehsil